James P. Levy (born January 5, 1965) is an American historian whose published works have dealt with the Royal Navy in the 20th century and with Great Britain in the 1930s.

Early life and education

James P. Levy was born in Brooklyn, New York in 1965. He grew up in Hicksville, New York where he attended Holy Trinity High School. Levy matriculated at Hofstra University, earning a B.A. degree in History. Later, he studied International Political Economy and International Relations, receiving an MA in Political Science. His Ph.D. work was done under historian Michael Simpson at the University of Wales Swansea (now Swansea University). He has taught at the State University of New York at Farmingdale and at Hofstra University.

Publications

Levy published his dissertation as The Royal Navy’s Home Fleet in World War II (Palgrave, 2003). He followed this with a more popular work discussing the last years of peace titled Appeasement and Rearmament: Britain, 1936–1939. Historian Andrew Gordon wrote of Appeasement and Rearmament that:
Given Britain’s strategic, political, and economic situation, diplomacy make both pragmatic and ethical sense in the late 1930s. James P. Levy’s succinct and beautifully written synthesis of the case for the tandem policies of appeasement and rearmament places them in their proper context and relationship.
However, G.C. Peden was not impressed,  while David French represented Appeasement and Rearmament as primarily a stimulating work for undergraduates.
In addition, Levy has published articles in The Mariner’s Mirror, The Naval War College Review, Journal of Strategic Studies, War in History, and Global War Studies (see bibliography below).

Themes

Levy’s work has centered on naval affairs in the period 1933–1945. His broad theme has been that the British Royal Navy handled this period of stress and change with admirable skill, but operated within an economic, industrial, and political climate largely unfavorable to the Royal Navy’s efforts to meet its strategic goals. Most controversial in this project has been Levy’s wariness (at times bordering on frustrated hostility) of the hagiography surrounding the person of Winston Spencer Churchill. This unease at what he seems to view as an overly reverential attitude on the part of historians towards Churchill is clearly manifested in Levy’s assessment of the career of Admiral of the Fleet Sir Charles Morton Forbes, who led the Home Fleet in 1939–40 while Churchill was First Lord of the Admiralty and then Prime Minister.
More recently, Levy has begun analyzing the Royal Navy in relationship to its American and Japanese rivals. His latest article deals with the development of the Royal Navy’s Fleet Air Arm in the run-up to the Second World War. The evidence Levy uncovered in the archives points to a much more prolonged and serious engagement by the Royal Navy with the aircraft carrier and her embarked aircraft than has hitherto been understood or acknowledged by historians.

Learned societies
James P. Levy was elected a Fellow of the Royal Historical Society in November 2006 and is also a member of the Society for Military History and the American Historical Association.

Ideas about writing history
In his Home Fleet book, Levy wrote:
The following operational history absolves no one. Nor does it have a grand thesis about war, or Britain, or the course of Empire. Reconstructing and evaluating what happened was hard enough. It is, however, tinged with respect, a respect the officers and men of the Home Fleet earned in a great global conflict for freedom.
Later, in a book review that appeared in the Journal of Military History Levy opined:
And why must so many of us [historians] tie our historical investigations to a thesis or theory? Is it not acceptable to describe the past, comment on what appears to have been happening as best as we can recreate it, and let it go at that? Must we have a thesis, and then drive ourselves crazy (or worse, fool ourselves to keep the thesis alive) in order to “prove” this or that proposition?

References

 Appeasement and Rearmament: Britain, 1936–1939 (Rowman and Littlefield, 2006).
 The Royal Navy’s Home Fleet in World War II (Palgrave, 2003).
 "The Development of British Naval Aviation: Preparing the Fleet Air Arm for War, 1934-1939." Global War Studies 9 (2) (2012): 6-38.
 "Royal Navy Fleet Tactics on the eve of the Second World War." War in History 19 (3) (July 2012): 379-395.
 "Race for the Decisive Weapon: British, American, and Japanese Carrier Fleets, 1942-1943." The Naval War College Review 58 (1) (Winter 2005): 137-50.
 "The Needs of Political Policy versus the Reality of Military Operations: Royal Navy Opposition to the Arctic Convoys, 1942." The Journal of Strategic Studies 26 (1) (March 2003): 36-52.
 "Lost Leader: Admiral of the Fleet Sir Charles Forbes and World War II." The Mariner’s Mirror 88 (2) (May 2002): 186-195.
 "The Inglorious End of the Glorious: The Release of the Findings of the Board of Enquiry into the loss of HMS Glorious." The Mariner’s Mirror 86 (3) (August 2000): 302-309.
 "Ready or Not? The Royal Navy’s Home Fleet at the Outset of World War II." The Naval War College Review 52 (4) (Autumn 1999): 90-108.
 "Weighed against its historical costs, war has a poor record of achieving its goals." Military History 23 (November 2006): 19-22.
 "Neville Chamberlain’s Appeasement policy as the cause of World War II is one of history’s myths." Military History 23 (September 2006): 65-67.

1965 births
Living people
21st-century American historians
21st-century American male writers
American male non-fiction writers